Darrin L. Williams is an American lawyer and politician from the U.S. state of Arkansas. A member of the Democratic Party, Williams is a former member of the Arkansas House of Representatives from District 36. He was term-limited and ineligible to run for re-election in 2014. He was House Speaker Pro Tempore for the term from March 2012 to December 2012.

Biography
Williams is from Little Rock, Arkansas. When Williams was a teenager, Bill Clinton, then the governor of Arkansas, appointed him to a school consolidation board. He attended Little Rock Central High School and was student body president in 1986. He then received his bachelor's degree from Hendrix College, his Master of Laws degree from Georgetown University Law Center, and his Juris Doctor from Vanderbilt University School of Law. During this time, he worked as an intern for Bill McCuen, the Secretary of State of Arkansas, and David Pryor, then a member of the United States Senate. Williams worked as a deputy director of the Democratic National Committee during the Clinton presidency.

Williams worked for Mark Pryor as his chief of staff, while Pryor was Attorney General of Arkansas, and as his deputy attorney general. He ran for the Arkansas House in Pulaski County for the first time in 2008. He is a partner at the law firm Carney Williams Bates Pulliam & Bowman, and is the CEO of Southern Bancorp Inc.

In September 2021, President Joe Biden appointed Williams to the Community Development Advisory Board.

References

External links

 

Living people
Politicians from Little Rock, Arkansas
Hendrix College alumni
Vanderbilt University Law School alumni
Georgetown University Law Center alumni
Democratic Party members of the Arkansas House of Representatives
Arkansas lawyers
African-American state legislators in Arkansas
Lawyers from Little Rock, Arkansas
Year of birth missing (living people)